The arrondissement of Tulle is an arrondissement of France in the Corrèze department in the Nouvelle-Aquitaine region. It has 104 communes.

Composition

The communes of the arrondissement of Tulle, and their INSEE codes, are:

 Affieux (19001)
 Albussac (19004)
 Les Angles-sur-Corrèze (19009)
 Argentat-sur-Dordogne (19010)
 Auriac (19014)
 Bar (19016)
 Bassignac-le-Bas (19017)
 Bassignac-le-Haut (19018)
 Beaumont (19020)
 Bonnefond (19027)
 Camps-Saint-Mathurin-Léobazel (19034)
 Chamberet (19036)
 Chamboulive (19037)
 Chameyrat (19038)
 Champagnac-la-Prune (19040)
 Chanac-les-Mines (19041)
 Chanteix (19042)
 La Chapelle-Saint-Géraud (19045)
 Le Chastang (19048)
 Clergoux (19056)
 Condat-sur-Ganaveix (19060)
 Cornil (19061)
 Corrèze (19062)
 Darazac (19069)
 L'Église-aux-Bois (19074)
 Espagnac (19075)
 Espartignac (19076)
 Eyburie (19079)
 Eyrein (19081)
 Favars (19082)
 Forgès (19084)
 Gimel-les-Cascades (19085)
 Goulles (19086)
 Gourdon-Murat (19087)
 Grandsaigne (19088)
 Gros-Chastang (19089)
 Gumond (19090)
 Hautefage (19091)
 Lacelle (19095)
 Ladignac-sur-Rondelles (19096)
 Lagarde-Marc-la-Tour (19098)
 Lagraulière (19100)
 Laguenne-sur-Avalouze (19101)
 Lamongerie (19104)
 Lestards (19112)
 Le Lonzac (19118)
 Madranges (19122)
 Masseret (19129)
 Meilhards (19131)
 Mercœur (19133)
 Monceaux-sur-Dordogne (19140)
 Naves (19146)
 Neuville (19149)
 Orgnac-sur-Vézère (19154)
 Orliac-de-Bar (19155)
 Pandrignes (19158)
 Perpezac-le-Noir (19162)
 Peyrissac (19165)
 Pierrefitte (19166)
 Pradines (19168)
 Reygade (19171)
 Rilhac-Treignac (19172)
 Rilhac-Xaintrie (19173)
 La Roche-Canillac (19174)
 Saint-Augustin (19181)
 Saint-Bonnet-Elvert (19186)
 Saint-Bonnet-les-Tours-de-Merle (19189)
 Saint-Chamant (19192)
 Saint-Cirgues-la-Loutre (19193)
 Saint-Clément (19194)
 Sainte-Fortunade (19203)
 Saint-Geniez-ô-Merle (19205)
 Saint-Germain-les-Vergnes (19207)
 Saint-Hilaire-les-Courbes (19209)
 Saint-Hilaire-Peyroux (19211)
 Saint-Hilaire-Taurieux (19212)
 Saint-Jal (19213)
 Saint-Julien-aux-Bois (19214)
 Saint-Julien-le-Pèlerin (19215)
 Saint-Martial-de-Gimel (19220)
 Saint-Martial-Entraygues (19221)
 Saint-Martin-la-Méanne (19222)
 Saint-Mexant (19227)
 Saint-Pardoux-la-Croisille (19231)
 Saint-Paul (19235)
 Saint-Priest-de-Gimel (19236)
 Saint-Privat (19237)
 Saint-Salvadour (19240)
 Saint-Sylvain (19245)
 Saint-Ybard (19248)
 Salon-la-Tour (19250)
 Seilhac (19255)
 Servières-le-Château (19258)
 Sexcles (19259)
 Soudaine-Lavinadière (19262)
 Tarnac (19265)
 Toy-Viam (19268)
 Treignac (19269)
 Tulle (19272)
 Uzerche (19276)
 Veix (19281)
 Viam (19284)
 Vigeois (19285)
 Vitrac-sur-Montane (19287)

History

The arrondissement of Tulle was created in 1800. At the January 2017 reorganisation of the arrondissements of Corrèze, it gained three communes from the arrondissement of Brive-la-Gaillarde and eight communes from the arrondissement of Ussel, and it lost two communes to the arrondissement of Brive-la-Gaillarde and 19 communes to the arrondissement of Ussel.

As a result of the reorganisation of the cantons of France which came into effect in 2015, the borders of the cantons are no longer related to the borders of the arrondissements. The cantons of the arrondissement of Tulle were, as of January 2015:

 Argentat
 Corrèze
 Égletons
 Lapleau
 Mercœur
 La Roche-Canillac
 Saint-Privat
 Seilhac
 Treignac
 Tulle-Campagne-Nord
 Tulle-Campagne-Sud
 Tulle-Urbain-Nord
 Tulle-Urbain-Sud
 Uzerche

References

Tulle